Softball was contested by seven teams at the 1998 Asian Games in Bangkok, Thailand from December 7 to December 16.

Schedule

Medalists

Results

Round robin

Final round

Semifinals

Final

Grand final

Final standing

References
 Results

 
1998 Asian Games events
1998
Asian Games
1998 Asian Games